Daniel Sullivan (died 1764) was an Irish countertenor, best known for his association with Georg Frideric Handel.

He began his career in the early 1740s, working with John Frederick and Isabella Lampe and performing in a staging of John Lampe's The Dragon of Wantley at Drury Lane in 1743. In 1744, Sullivan first worked with Handel, singing in one of his Covent Garden oratorios in 1744.

References
"Daniel Sullivan". The New Grove Dictionary of Opera.

18th-century Irish male opera singers
Countertenors
1764 deaths